Faro District is the southernmost district of Portugal, coincident with the Algarve region. The administrative centre, or district capital, is the city of Faro.

Municipalities
The district is composed of 16 municipalities:

 Albufeira
 Alcoutim
 Aljezur
 Castro Marim
 Faro
 Lagoa
 Lagos
 Loulé
 Monchique
 Olhão
 Portimão
 São Brás de Alportel
 Silves
 Tavira
 Vila do Bispo
 Vila Real de Santo António
All 16 municipalities is divided into 67 parishes or freguesias.

Cities 

 Albufeira
 Faro
 Lagoa
 Lagos
 Loulé
 Olhão
 Portimão
 Quarteira (Loulé)
 Silves
 Tavira
 Vila Real de Santo António

Villages 

 Alcantarilha (Silves)
 Alcoutim
 Algoz (Silves)
 Almancil (Loulé)
 Alvor (Portimão)
 Armação de Pêra (Silves)
 Aljezur
 Bensafrim (Lagos)
 Cabanas de Tavira (Tavira)
 Carvoeiro (Lagoa)
 Castro Marim
 Estômbar (Lagoa)
 Ferragudo (Lagoa)
 Fuseta (Olhão)
 Luz (Lagos)
 Luz de Tavira (Tavira)
 Mexilhoeira Grande (Olhão)
 Moncarapacho (Olhão)
 Monchique
 Monte Gordo (Vila Real de Santo António)
 Odeceixe (Aljezur)
 Odiáxere (Lagos)
 Parchal (Lagoa)
 Pêra (Silves)
 Porches (Lagoa)
 Sagres (Vila do Bispo)
 Salir (Loulé)
 Santa Luzia (Tavira)
 São Bartolomeu de Messines (Silves)
 São Brás de Alportel
 Vila do Bispo
 Vila Nova de Cacela (Vila Real de Santo António)

History

Pre-Roman Times 

In Pre-Roman Portugal, the area was inhabited by the Cynetes (or Conii), a people (formed by several tribes) of linguistic and ethnic affiliation, possibly Celtic or Iberian, whose territory included the modern area of the Beja District. This former territory of the Cysteines ran from the mouth of the Mira River all the way to the Guadiana River. It is possible that they were related to the Tartessos (people whose linguistic and ethnic affiliation is also not yet fully known or determined), but were not the same people.

Roman Times 
 Before the definitive integration of the canons into the Roman Empire, during the period from about 200 BC to 141 BC, they were under strong Roman influence, but enjoyed a high degree of autonomy. In part, due to the favorably relationship with the Romans, the colonies had some conflicts with the Lusitanians, who under the leadership of Caucenus, the Lusitanian leader before Viriathus, had conquered their territory for some time, including the capital, Conistorgis (whose location is still not known, but is thought to be in modern-day Faro or Castro Marim) in 153 BC. Partly due to this conflict with the Portuguese (and partly due to the cultural influence of Mediterranean civilizations), unlike many pre-Roman peoples of Portugal, they were allies of the Romans for some time and not their opponents, differing from the attitude of most of the other peoples, such as the Lusitanians who were strong opponents of the Romans.

Nevertheless, a while later, in the context of the Lusitanian Wars, in the year of 141BC, the Conidia revolted against the Roman Empire, along with the Turduli of Beturia (also called betures), but were quickly defeated by Quintus Fabius Maximus Servilianus, a Roman proconsul, and was definitively integrated into the Roman Empire.

Barbarian Era 
Despite being conquered by the so-called barbarian peoples (Vandals, Alans, Suebi, and later Visigoths) at the time of Barbarian migrations or invasions, Roman culture and Christianity remained there for a period of time. In the year 552, the current area of Algarve was regained by the Eastern Roman Empire or Byzantine Empire (then governed by Emperor Justinian I), and appointed a government that lasted till the year 571, when King Liuvigild conquered it for the Visigothic Kingdom.

Fauna 
The Cape St. Vincent is situated in a route of migrating birds, allowing for the seasonal observation of the variety of bird life.

The subsoil of the district is inhabited by several endemic species unique to Faro, some still just being discovered. The most emblematic species of the underground fauna of the Algarve are the giant pseudo-scorpion of the Algarve caves (Titanobochica magna) and the largest terrestrial cave insect in Europe, Squamatinia algharbica.

Summary of votes and seats won 1976-2022

|- class="unsortable"
!rowspan=2|Parties!!%!!S!!%!!S!!%!!S!!%!!S!!%!!S!!%!!S!!%!!S!!%!!S!!%!!S!!%!!S!!%!!S!!%!!S!!%!!S!!%!!S!!%!!S!!%!!S
|- class="unsortable" style="text-align:center;"
!colspan=2 | 1976
!colspan=2 | 1979
!colspan=2 | 1980
!colspan=2 | 1983
!colspan=2 | 1985
!colspan=2 | 1987
!colspan=2 | 1991
!colspan=2 | 1995
!colspan=2 | 1999
!colspan=2 | 2002
!colspan=2 | 2005
!colspan=2 | 2009
!colspan=2 | 2011
!colspan=2 | 2015
!colspan=2 | 2019
!colspan=2 | 2022
|-
| style="text-align:left;"| PS || style="background:#f6f;"|44.6 || style="background:#f6f;"|6 || 34.0 || 3 ||34.7 || 4 || style="background:#f6f;"|43.2 || style="background:#f6f;"|5 || 22.3 || 2 || 24.9 || 3 || 31.2 || 3 || style="background:#f6f;"|49.6 || style="background:#f6f;"|5  || style="background:#f6f;"|48.4 || style="background:#f6f;"|5 || style="background:#f6f;"|40.5 || style="background:#f6f;"|4 || style="background:#f6f;"|49.3 || style="background:#f6f;"|6 || style="background:#f6f;"|31.9 || style="background:#f6f;"|3 || 23.0 || 2 || style="background:#f6f;"|32.8 || style="background:#f6f;"|4 || style="background:#f6f;"|36.8 || style="background:#f6f;"|5 || style="background:#f6f;"|39.9 || style="background:#f6f;"|5
|-
| style="text-align:left;"| PSD || 19.3 || 2 || style="text-align:center;" colspan="4" rowspan="2"|In AD || 23.1 || 2 || style="background:#f90;"|28.4 || style="background:#f90;"|3 || style="background:#f90;"|46.7 || style="background:#f90;"|5 || style="background:#f90;"|50.8 || style="background:#f90;"|5 || 29.2 || 3 || 29.5|| 3 || 37.7 || 4 || 24.6 || 2 || 26.2 || 3 || style="background:#f90;"|37.0 || style="background:#f90;"|4 || style="text-align:center;" colspan="2" rowspan="2"|In PàF || 22.3 || 3 || 24.4 || 3
|-
| style="text-align:left;"| CDS-PP || 6.8 ||  || 7.4 ||  || 6.1 ||  || 3.1 ||  || 2.8 ||  || 8.3 ||  || 7.3 ||  || 8.3 ||  || 5.8 ||  || 10.7 || 1 || 12.7 || 1 || 3.8 ||  || 1.1 || 
|-
| style="text-align:left;"| PCP/APU/CDU || 14.5 || 1 || 20.3|| 2 || 16.7 || 1 || 18.6 || 2 || 15.4 || 2 || 10.9 || 1 || 7.2 ||  || 7.8 ||  || 8.3 ||  || 6.3 ||  || 6.9 ||  || 7.8 ||  || 8.6 || 1 || 8.7 || 1 || 7.1 ||  || 4.8 || 
|-
| style="text-align:left;"| AD || colspan=2| || style="background:#0ff;"|34.6 || style="background:#0ff;"|4 || style="background:#0ff;"|37.2 || style="background:#0ff;"|4 || colspan=26|
|-
| style="text-align:left;"| PRD || colspan=8| || 20.5 || 2 || 6.3 ||  || colspan=20| 
|-
| style="text-align:left;"| BE || colspan=16| || 2.3 ||  || 2.8 ||  || 7.7 ||  || 15.3 || 1 || 8.2 || 1 || 14.1 || 1 || 12.3 || 1 || 5.8
|-
| style="text-align:left;"| PàF || colspan=26| || 31.5 || 3 || colspan=4|
|-
! Total seats || colspan=12|9 || colspan=12|8 || colspan=8|9
|-
! colspan=33|Source: Comissão Nacional de Eleições
|}

See also

Faro, Portugal
Algarve
Senhora do Verde, a village in the district of Faro

Notes 

 
Districts of Portugal
Districts in Algarve